The Mono Basin is an endorheic drainage basin located east of Yosemite National Park in California and Nevada. It is bordered to the west by the Sierra Nevada, to the east by the Cowtrack Mountains, to the north by the Bodie Hills, and to the south by the north ridge of the Long Valley Caldera.

Estimates of the size of the basin range from 634 to 801 square miles, and the basin's elevation ranges from around 6,380 feet (level of Mono Lake as of 1986) to 13,061 feet atop Mount Dana near the Sierra Crest.

Notable features in the basin include Mono Lake and the Mono-Inyo Craters, as well as the town of Lee Vining.

Geology
Geologically the basin is a structural basin that is bordered to the west by the frontal fault of the Sierra Nevada. The basin is part of the Walker Lane, an area where much of the deformation between the North American Plate and the Pacific Plate occurs. The basin was created by geological forces over the last five million years by crustal stretching of the Basin and Range province and associated volcanism and faulting at the base of the Sierra Nevada. Five million years ago, the Sierra Nevada was an eroded set of rolling hills and Mono Basin and Owens Valley did not yet exist.

Later volcanism in the area occurred 3.8 million to 250,000 years ago. This activity was northwest of Mono Basin and included the formation of Aurora Crater, Beauty Peak, Cedar Hill (later an island in the highest stands of Mono Lake), and Mount Hicks. The area remains volcanically active today, with Paoha Island forming from volcanic activity 350 years ago.

See also
Mono Basin National Scenic Area

Footnotes

References

External links
 Mono Lake Committee

Landforms of the Sierra Nevada (United States)
Valleys of Mono County, California
Valleys of California